Molasses (also released as Bittersweet) is a 2010 Egyptian comedy film. The literal translation of the title is "Black Honey", relating to the bitter-sweet feelings that Egyptians feel towards living in their country.

Plot 
Masry is an Egyptian who left his country when only 10 years old. He returns to Egypt 20 years later following the death of his father. Masry desires to get back in touch with his roots and to revive his nostalgic memories of how Egypt used to be. However, he quickly becomes disenchanted upon experiencing first hand the chaos that Egypt has descended into. He learns the hard way that Egyptians
citizens have very few rights and that they live a very tough life where foreigners are often treated with more respect than Egyptians themselves. Despite the fact that this production discusses very serious issues, the film is nonetheless a mix of comedy and light drama and serves as a poignant reminder of our current times.

Summary 
Masry Sayed El-Araby is an
Egyptian American
photographer who returns to Egypt after twenty years abroad, having left Egypt twenty years ago when he and his family immigrated to America.

After arriving he goes through a series of events that led him to being conned, beaten by protestors and losing his American passport. In a fit of rage, he decides to throw away his Egyptian passport as well, which leaves him stranded in the country until he can get all of his documents back. He then decides to go back to his father's old apartment and live there after being kicked out of the hotel he is staying at.

Masry is reunited with his neighbour and childhood friend Said and his family, where he helps him by fixing up his father's old apartment and inviting him to live with him and his family while it gets repaired. Masry experiences the typical activities that Egyptians endure to get his life in order and to get his American passport back so he can back to the United States. living with Said, Masry experiences the delights of the Egyptian culture that has been a part of him that has been lacking in his life since he left Egypt in his youth.

After getting his life in order, he says goodbye to all of the companions he had met during his stay in Egypt and boards a plane to leave Egypt. During the take-off, he realizes that his stay has changed him and decides to stay in Egypt.

Cast

 Ahmed Helmy as Masry Sayed El-Araby 
 Edward as Said 
 Lotfy Labib as Radi
 Enaam Salousa as Saeed's Mother
 Ahmed Rateb as Officer
 Emy Samir Ghanem as Mervat
 Dina Talaat

Reception 
Overall reception has been positive, with critics praising the depiction of Cairo and its residents from the point of view of an Egyptian living outside of Egypt. Some critics have less favourable reviews, citing that Assal Eswed clings to the nationalistic tendencies of Egyptians in order to develop a relatable character to average Egyptians.

References

External links 

2010 films
2010s Arabic-language films
Films set in Egypt
2010 black comedy films
2010 comedy films
Egyptian black comedy films